Muhammad Attamimi Halilintar (born 20 November 1994), professionally known as Atta Halilintar or simply as Atta is an Indonesian YouTuber, content creator, social media personality, actor, singer and businessman. He is the first YouTuber in Southeast Asia to earn the Diamond Play Button. He is currently regarded as the most popular YouTuber in Indonesia and hails from the popular Gen Halilintar family, which is known for recording songs and publications. As of December 2021, he has approximately 28.3 million subscribers and was ranked 113th most popular YouTuber in the world for the year 2021.

Early life 
Atta was born in Dumai, Riau as the eldest of 11 children in his family which is popularly known as the Gen Halilintar. The Gen Halilintar family joined the entertainment industry by publishing books about their journey around the world, making vlogs and recording songs. His siblings are also known for recording songs and YouTube videos. He inherited his family business from his parents at a young age. During his childhood, his parents experienced major obstacles and difficulties in running their family business when they lived in Malaysia. He then concentrated to engage in business activities selling food and toys at his young age while pursuing his primary education in elementary school.

Career 
While busy with his family business, he launched his official YouTube account in 2016 and became popular in Indonesia in a matter of years. He became the first YouTuber from South East Asia to cross 10 million subscribers as of February 2019. In August 2019, his YouTube account was reported to have achieved 18.5 million subscribers. He also became the eighth highest earning YouTuber in the world with a net worth of £1.37 million as of August 2019.

In November 2019, he became the first Indonesian YouTuber ever to surpass the milestone of 20 million subscribers; an achievement that was mentioned and recognised as part of YouTube Rewind's 2019 edition. Beyond Indonesia, he also currently has the highest number of subscribers in the ASEAN region.

He is developing a business under AHHA Hijab brands. Atta also notably featured in a few films as a supporting actor and has also recorded a few songs as a rapper.

Personal life
On April 3, 2021, Atta married the first child of a politician and musician, Aurel Hermansyah. The wedding was attended by President Joko Widodo, who served as witness, and Defence Minister Prabowo Subianto.

Controversies 
In March 2019, he posted a video in his official Instagram account featuring himself with a gun in wake of the 2019 Christchurch mosque shootings. His video was slammed, with people calling it a result of toxic behaviour.

In November 2019, he was accused of alleged blasphemy and was reported to the police for his prank video on Islamic prayers.

Filmography 

 13: The Haunted (2018)
 Belok Kanan Barcelona (2018)
 The Return of the Devil Child (2019)
 Ashiap Man (2020)

Discography 

 Viral (2017)
 Don't forget to be happy (2017)
 Eid song (2018)
 God Bless You (2018)
 Dimensions of Love (2018)
 Work Hard Pray Hard (2018)
 Ramadan has arrived (2018)
 Anak Indonesia (2019)
 Exposure (2019)
 Teman tapi Cinta (2020)
 Bersama Kita Mampu (2020)
 Calon Bojo (2020)
 Aku Miss You (2021)
 Hari Bahhagia (2021)
 Takbir (2021)
 This is Indonesia (2021)

See also 

 List of YouTubers

References

External links 

 

1994 births
Indonesian YouTubers
Living people
Indonesian male actors
21st-century Indonesian male singers
Indonesian rappers
Indonesian businesspeople
People from Riau
Minangkabau people